Detlev Wulf Bronk (August 13, 1897 – November 17, 1975) was a prominent American scientist, educator, and administrator. He is credited with establishing biophysics as a recognized discipline. Bronk served as president of Johns Hopkins University from 1949 to 1953 and as president of The Rockefeller University from 1953 to 1968. Bronk also held the presidency of the National Academy of Sciences between 1950 and 1962.

Biography
Bronk was a descendant of Pieter Bronck, an early settler to New Netherland for whose relative Jonas Bronck the New York City borough The Bronx is named. Bronk graduated from Swarthmore College with a B.S. in electrical engineering, where he was a member of Phi Kappa Psi Fraternity. In September 1921 Bronk married Helen Alexander Ramsey, who had been a fellow student at Swarthmore. Turning to physics, he received an M.S. in 1922 from the University of Michigan. By 1924 he was intent on applying physics and mathematics to physiology, receiving a Ph.D. in 1926 from the University of Michigan.

Career
When Bronk was offered the presidency of Johns Hopkins University in 1948, he accepted the position on the condition that Hopkins strengthen its program in biophysics.  Hopkins did just that, building Jenkins Hall in 1950 specifically to house Biophysics and adding faculty and research facilities.  Bronk believed the nation's universities had a responsibility to prepare students to improve the world, regardless of their academic curriculum.  He also recognized that, during World War II, the Hopkins faculty had spent most of their time performing defense-related research, and now it was time to rejuvenate the idea of research for the sake of learning and discovery.  He frequently spoke on "breadth in education," "fostering curiosity," and "a university is a community of scholars."

In addition to guiding Hopkins through its post-war "demobilization," Bronk believed strongly in maintaining his own presence in the scientific community.  He presided over the National Academy of Sciences and served on boards for the American Association for the Advancement of Science, the Science Advisory Committee of the Office of Defense Mobilization, and the National Advisory Committee for Aeronautics (predecessor to NASA).

Bronk was also instrumental in reviving a plan to abolish undergraduate education at Johns Hopkins and turn Hopkins into a graduate-only institution.  In 1952, as in 1925, the "New Plan" or "Bronk Plan" would have phased out the freshman and sophomore years and Hopkins would only admit students transferring from other institutions as juniors or above.  These students would bypass the traditional undergraduate degree and begin work immediately toward a doctorate.  As in 1925, the plan attracted little support from the intended student body and it was quietly dropped by the mid-1950s after Prof. Sidney Flax said "no".

From 1953 to 1968 Bronk was president of The Rockefeller University.  (The Rockefeller Institute for Medical Research was renamed The Rockefeller University in 1965). He firmly espoused academic freedom and resisted attempts by Wisconsin Senator Joseph McCarthy to have Johns Hopkins University dismiss Professor Owen Lattimore. The same year he was awarded the Public Welfare Medal from the National Academy of Sciences. He was credited with formulating the modern theory of the science of biophysics. He served on the board of trustees for Science Service, now known as Society for Science & the Public, from 1965 to 1967. Bronk is quoted as saying:

References

1897 births
1975 deaths
American biophysicists
Foreign Members of the Royal Society
Swarthmore College alumni
Presidential Medal of Freedom recipients
Presidents of Johns Hopkins University
Presidents of Rockefeller University
University of Michigan College of Literature, Science, and the Arts alumni
University of Michigan faculty
University of Pennsylvania faculty
Members of the United States National Academy of Sciences
Presidents of the United States National Academy of Sciences
National Medal of Science laureates
Scientists from New York City
United States Army Science Board people
Members of the Royal Swedish Academy of Sciences